The 1989–90 American Indoor Soccer Association season was the sixth season for the league.  Before the season, Atlanta was added, Ft. Wayne changed their name to Indiana, and Memphis changed their nickname to the Rogues. After the season, Indiana moved to Albany, New York. Because of mounting debt, on June 23, 1990, the AISA expelled Memphis from the league and repudiated its line of credit. After the season, the league also changed its name to the National Professional Soccer League.

League Standings

American Division

National Division

All-Star Game
The Soviet Red Army team defeated the AISA All-Stars 10–8 in overtime on Oleg Sergeyev's goal 1:54 into the extra session. With one goal and two assists, Drago of the Hershey Impact was voted the MVP of the match by the attending media.

AISA All-Star roster
Coach: Timo Liekoski, Canton
Asst. Coach: John Dolinsky, Milwaukee

Match report

Playoffs

League Leaders

Scoring

Goalkeeping

League awards
Most Valuable Player: Jamie Swanner, Canton 
Coach of the Year: Rick Schweizer, Dayton 
Defender of the Year: Bret Hall, Chicago 
Goalkeeper of the Year: Jamie Swanner, Canton 
Rookie of the Year: Brian Haynes, Atlanta

All-AISA Teams

References

External links
Major Indoor Soccer League II (RSSSF)
1990 in American Soccer

1989 in American soccer leagues
1990 in American soccer leagues
1989-90